The Suzie River is a tributary of the Mégiscane River flowing into the municipality of Senneterre in La Vallée-de-l'Or Regional County Municipality (RCM), in the administrative region Abitibi-Témiscamingue, in the province of Quebec, in Canada.

The Suzie River crosses the townships Jalobert, Bourgmont, Bongard, Logan and Bernier. The course deviated by the dams flows rather in the canton of Brécourt via Lake Brécourt.

The Suzie River flows entirely on forest land north-east of the La Vérendrye Wildlife Reserve and on the west side of Gouin Reservoir. Forestry is the main economic activity of this hydrographic slope; recreational tourism activities, second. The surface of the river is usually frozen from mid-December to mid-April.

Geography

History 
In 1948, the Government of Quebec approved the Shawinigan Water & Power Company project to raise the Gouin Reservoir, in order to increase the flow of the Saint-Maurice River and consequently increase the hydro-electric production. The Shawinigan Water & Power Company was able to carry out this project, by diverting the headwaters of the Mégiscane River and the Suzie River, which flowed naturally to the north, the James Bay, to make them flow south to the St. Lawrence River by the Saint-Maurice River. A series of dykes and canals have been built in these two rivers in order to carry out the diversion of the waters.

Toponymy
According to the Commission de toponymie du Québec, a first document, the name "Susie River" was approved on July 16, 1935, by the Quebec Geography Commission and according to a second, the name "Suzie River" was approved December 30, 1963.

The toponym "Suzie River" was inscribed on December 5, 1968, at the "Bank of Place Names" of the Commission de toponymie du Québec, when it was created.

See also

References

External links 

Rivers of Abitibi-Témiscamingue
Nottaway River drainage basin
La Vallée-de-l’Or